Jan Erik Lindqvist (25 July 1920 – 23 October 1988) was a Swedish actor. He appeared in more than 70 films and television shows between 1942 and 1988.

Selected filmography
 We House Slaves (1942)
 Realm of Man (1949)
 Dance in the Smoke (1954)
 The Red Horses (1954)
 A Lion in Town (1959)
 Siska (1962)
 Loving Couples (1964)
 Here's Your Life (1966)
 Face to Face (1976)
 Near and Far Away (1976)

References

External links

1920 births
1988 deaths
20th-century Swedish male actors
Swedish male film actors
Swedish male television actors
Male actors from Stockholm